111 is the third album by Željko Joksimović, a Serbian pop singer released in 2002.

Track listing
 Ko Da Ne Postojim
 Karavan
 Drska Ženo Plava
 Najmoje
 Tanana
 Varnice
 Hej Ljubavi Stara
 Zaboravljaš
 Jesi Li Me Volela

Release history

References

2002 albums
Željko Joksimović albums
City Records albums